Anna Glacier is a glacier flowing southeast between Rose Peak and Rea Peak, tributary to Polonia Glacier/Polonia Ice Piedmont at the head of King George Bay, King George Island. It was named by the Polish Antarctic Expedition (PAE), 1981, after Anna Tokarska, field assistant of PAE geological party to King George Island, 1979–80, and wife of Antoni K. Tokarski.

See also
 List of glaciers in the Antarctic
 Glaciology

References
 

Glaciers of King George Island (South Shetland Islands)
Poland and the Antarctic